Augustine Randolf (born 26 March 2001) is a Ghanaian professional footballer who plays as a defender for Ghanaian Premier League side Karela United.

Career 
Randolf played for Bechem United before moving to Karela United. He played 10 league matches in the 2019–20 Ghana Premier League season. In September 2020, he signed a 3-year deal with Western Region-based club Karela United ahead of the 2020–21 Ghana Premier League season.

References

External links 

 

Living people
2001 births
Association football defenders
Ghanaian footballers
Bechem United F.C. players
Karela United FC players
Ghana Premier League players
Ghana A' international footballers
2022 African Nations Championship players